Lemrini is a surname. Notable people with the surname include:

 Amina Lemrini, Moroccan human rights activist
 Youssef Lemrini (born 1960), Moroccan footballer and manager